Věra Flasarová (born 19 December 1952 in Ostrava) is a Czech politician and Member of the European Parliament for the Communist Party of Bohemia and Moravia; part of the European United Left–Nordic Green Left party group in the European Parliament.
She was elected initially in the period 2004–2009, but she entered again the European Parliament in January 2014 replacing Vladimír Remek who became the Czech ambassador to Moscow.

References 

Living people
1952 births
Politicians from Ostrava
Communist Party of Bohemia and Moravia MEPs
MEPs for the Czech Republic 2004–2009
Women MEPs for the Czech Republic
Communist Party of Czechoslovakia members
Technical University of Ostrava alumni